Uzzah Pope (born 3 January 1971) is a Vincentian cricketer. He played in 33 first-class and 25 List A matches for the Windward Islands from 1991 to 2003.

See also
 List of Windward Islands first-class cricketers

References

External links
 

1971 births
Living people
Saint Vincent and the Grenadines cricketers
Windward Islands cricketers